The 21st National Assembly of South Korea is the current session of the National Assembly. Its members were first elected in the 2020 legislative election held on 15 April 2020. The session first convened on 30 May 2020, and is scheduled to be seated until 29 May 2024.

Composition

In the 2020 legislative election, more than five political parties were elected to the Assembly.

List of members

Constituency

Seoul

Busan

Daegu

Incheon

Gwangju

Daejeon

Ulsan

Sejong

Gyeonggi

Gangwon

North Chungcheong

South Chungcheong

North Jeolla

South Jeolla

North Gyeongsang

South Gyeongsang

Jeju

Proportional representation

Platform -> Democratic

Future Korea -> United Future -> People Power

Justice

References

020
National Assembly members 020